"Redemption" is a 2015 single by Sigma and Diztortion. It features the vocals from Jacob Banks. It was announced as Radio 1's Track of the Day on 2 October 2015. A music video was produced for the song which features Banks on vocals.

Track listing

Charts

References

2015 songs
2015 singles
Sigma songs
All Around the World Productions singles